Gal Sapir is an Israeli footballer who plays for F.C. Holon Yermiyahu.

Honours
Liga Leumit:
Runner-up (1): 2010–11
U-21 Israel national team 2011

References

External links
 
 

1990 births
Israeli Jews
Living people
Israeli footballers
Hapoel Rishon LeZion F.C. players
SC Telstar players
Hapoel Afula F.C. players
Beitar Tel Aviv Bat Yam F.C. players
Maccabi Ahi Nazareth F.C. players
Hapoel Marmorek F.C. players
Hapoel Bnei Lod F.C. players
Hapoel Azor F.C. players
F.C. Holon Yermiyahu players
Israeli expatriate footballers
Expatriate footballers in the Netherlands
Expatriate footballers in Georgia (country)
Israeli expatriate sportspeople in the Netherlands
Israeli expatriate sportspeople in Georgia (country)
Israeli Premier League players
Liga Leumit players
Footballers from Rishon LeZion
Association football defenders